Dolinsky (masculine), Dolinskaya (feminine), or Dolinskoye (neuter) is the name of several rural localities in Russia:
Dolinsky (rural locality), a settlement in Groznensky District of the Chechen Republic
Dolinskoye, Russia, a selo in Tulatinsky Selsoviet of Charyshsky District of Altai Krai